Simon Luc Hildebert Mignolet (born 6 March 1988) is a Belgian professional footballer who plays as a goalkeeper for Belgian Pro League club Club Brugge.

Mignolet started his career with Belgian Second Division side Sint-Truiden in 2004, and spent six years with the club, making 100 senior league appearances and scoring a goal. He moved to Premier League side Sunderland in June 2010 for £2 million, spending three years with them and making 101 appearances across all competitions before moving to Liverpool in June 2013 for £9 million.

Mignolet represented the Belgium national team at every level from under-16 upwards. He made his senior debut in 2011, and went on to earn over 30 caps. He was also named to Belgium's squad for the 2014, 2018 and 2022 FIFA World Cup, and UEFA Euro 2016 and 2020.

Club career

Sint-Truiden
Mignolet was born in Sint-Truiden. He first joined his local football team, Belgian Second Division side Sint-Truiden, in 2004, eventually rising through their youth system to become their first-choice goalkeeper in 2006 at age 18 after the departure of Dušan Belić. In 2009, he made 29 appearances and scored a penalty in the league, as he helped Sint-Truiden to win the Belgian Second Division, and was named Belgian Goalkeeper of the Year the following year after he helped Sint-Truiden avoid relegation.

Sunderland

After being invited for a training ground tour, Mignolet signed a five-year contract with English Premier League club Sunderland on 17 June 2010 in a deal worth £2 million. It was later confirmed by Sint-Truiden that Sunderland had beaten PSV, Twente and Udinese to secure Mignolet's signature.

Mignolet made his Sunderland debut in a 2–2 draw against Birmingham City on 15 August 2010, and was named man of the match for his performance. In the next home match, a 1–0 victory against Manchester City, Mignolet kept his first clean sheet for Sunderland, following an excellent reaction save to deny Emmanuel Adebayor a goal. Mignolet put in another fine performance against Arsenal, as Sunderland drew 1–1 after Darren Bent equalised in the 95th minute. However, Craig Gordon would replace Mignolet in goal several weeks later, and remained first-choice thereafter. Mignolet did not feature again until 8 January 2011, when Sunderland suffered a loss at home to Notts County in the third round of the FA Cup. Mignolet would become first-choice goalkeeper again after a knee injury to Gordon in February, and earned a string of rave reviews for his performances. Following the draw, Sunderland manager Steve Bruce hailed the young goalkeeper's fine start to life in English football. Mignolet cemented his position as first-choice goalkeeper the following season, being preferred to new signing Keiren Westwood.

On 29 October 2011, Mignolet was injured during a 2–2 draw with Aston Villa, suffering a broken nose following a collision with Emile Heskey. Mignolet played every single match of the following season, keeping a large number of clean sheets and producing several man of the match performances. His form prompted Manchester City and England goalkeeper Joe Hart to praise Mignolet in December 2012 as being the best goalkeeper in the league so far that season. On 21 June 2013, it was reported Liverpool had agreed a deal to sign the player for around £9 million.

Liverpool

2013–14 season 

On 25 June 2013, Mignolet signed with Liverpool for a reported fee of £9 million on a five-year contract. Liverpool manager Brendan Rodgers hailed Mignolet as being "one of the top goalkeepers in the Premier League". On 13 July 2013, he made his unofficial debut for Liverpool in a 4–0 win in a pre-season friendly over Preston North End. On 17 August 2013, Mignolet made his official debut in the 1–0 home win against Stoke City at Anfield. In the 89th minute of the match, he saved a Jonathan Walters penalty, as well as Kenwyne Jones' follow-up shot, to preserve Liverpool's lead and effectively win the match. He then recorded two more clean sheets against Aston Villa and Manchester United, with both matches ending 1–0 in favour of Liverpool. Two weeks later, he conceded his first goals for Liverpool in the Premier League in a 2–2 draw with Swansea City, though he was still named man of the match for the fixture. Mignolet was also named man of the match in the 3–3 draw with Everton, making nine saves throughout the match.

2014–15 season 
On 14 December 2014, Mignolet's run of 53 consecutive Premier League starts came to an end as he was replaced by Brad Jones in the starting 11 against Manchester United, with Brendan Rodgers saying Mignolet would be dropped for an "indefinite period". However, 12 days later, Jones went off injured after 16 minutes away at Burnley, and despite some errors, Mignolet kept a clean sheet in a 1–0 victory. After this match, Mignolet kept four consecutive clean sheets against Sunderland, Aston Villa, West Ham United and Everton respectively. On 10 February, Mignolet made some outstanding saves against Tottenham Hotspur in a 3–2 win. On 16 March, Mignolet continued his resurgence in a 1–0 victory against Swansea, keeping a clean sheet as part of a strong performance. On 22 March, he saved a penalty taken by Wayne Rooney in a 2–1 defeat against Manchester United.

2015–16 season 
On 18 January 2016, Mignolet signed a new five-year deal with the club. Eight days later, he saved a penalty from Stoke City's Peter Crouch and Marc Muniesa in a penalty shoot-out to send Liverpool to the 2016 Football League Cup Final at Wembley Stadium.

2016–17 season 
Although he started the first five matches of the season, Liverpool manager Jürgen Klopp dropped Mignolet in favor of new signing Loris Karius on 24 September 2016 for the match against Hull City. On 24 October 2016, Klopp confirmed Mignolet was no longer Liverpool's first-choice goalkeeper and that he would be given cup matches instead. However, Mignolet returned to the starting lineup for the team in Premier League in December 2016.

2017–18 season 
On 23 September 2017, Mignolet saved his club-record 8th penalty, preserving a 3–2 victory over Leicester City. On 4 November, Mignolet captained Liverpool for the first time in a 4-1 win against West Ham United. On 26 December, Mignolet and teammate Philippe Coutinho both made their 200th appearances for Liverpool in a 5–0 Premier League win over Swansea.

2018–19 season 
Liverpool signed Alisson Becker as their first choice goalkeeper which led to Mignolet playing domestic cup games only. He started the 2–1 defeat to Chelsea in the EFL Cup on 26 September 2018. Mignolet also started in the 2–1 defeat to Wolverhampton Wanderers in the FA Cup on 7 January 2019. Mignolet was an unused substitute in the 2019 UEFA Champions League Final, which Liverpool won 2–0.

Club Brugge 
On 4 August 2019, following the 2019 FA Community Shield, Mignolet signed a five-year contract with Belgian side Club Brugge, for a reported fee of £6.4 million.

International career

Mignolet first represented the Belgian under-21 side in 2008, and went on to make ten appearances for the side. On 1 September 2010, he won his first call up to the Belgian senior squad after a good run of form for Sunderland. He made his full international debut in a 2–0 victory over Austria on 25 March 2011 in a UEFA Euro 2012 qualifying match. He remained in the starting line-up for each of the four remaining qualifying matches, in addition to playing in three friendly matches during the qualifying campaign. However, he was unable to help Belgium qualify for the Euro 2012 finals, as a 3–1 defeat against Germany saw them finish third in their qualifying group.

Mignolet played in two further friendly internationals during the 2011–12 season, starting against Greece and England. However, following the match against England, he did not play an international match for four months, with Thibaut Courtois being preferred instead. He returned to the starting lineup on 14 November 2012 in a 1–2 friendly loss over Romania. His next international match came over six months later in a 4–2 friendly victory over the United States on 29 May 2013.

Mignolet served as back-up goalkeeper during the 2014 FIFA World Cup qualification campaign, with Courtois playing every minute as Belgium qualified for its first major tournament since the 2002 World Cup.

On 10 October 2015, Mignolet started for an injured Courtois in Belgium's last two Euro 2016 qualifying matches: a 4–1 win over Andorra and a 3–1 victory over Israel, helping seal Belgium's qualification for the first time since co-hosting Euro 2000.

In May 2018, Mignolet was named in Belgium's preliminary squad for the 2018 World Cup in Russia, and later appeared on their final 23-man squad as a goalkeeper together with Thibaut Courtois and Koen Casteels. He would go on to be named in the final squads for UEFA Euro 2020 and the 2022 World Cup, but again did not make an appearance at either tournament.

On 14 March 2023, Mignolet officially announced his retirement from international football at the age of 35.

Personal life
Mignolet can speak Dutch, English, French and German. He has a degree in political science from the Catholic University of Leuven. On 20 June 2015, Mignolet married his girlfriend Jasmien Claes in his hometown. Their son, Lex, was born in October 2019. Their second son, Vin, was born in March 2022.

Career statistics

Club

International

Honours
Sint-Truiden
Belgian Second Division: 2008–09

Liverpool
UEFA Champions League: 2018–19; runner-up: 2017–18
Football League Cup runner-up: 2015–16
UEFA Europa League runner-up: 2015–16

Club Brugge
Belgian First Division A: 2019–20, 2020–21, 2021–22
Belgian Cup runner-up: 2019–20
Belgian Super Cup: 2022

Belgium
FIFA World Cup third place: 2018

Individual
Belgian Goalkeeper of the Year: 2009–10
Sint-Truiden Player of the Year: 2008-09, 2009-10
Belgian Professional Goalkeeper of the Year: 2010, 2021
North-East FWA Player of the Year: 2012
Sunderland Player of the Year: 2012–13
MOTD Keeper of the Year: 2013
Belgian First Division A Goalkeeper of the Year: 2019, 2020, 2021, 2022
Club Brugge Player of the Year: 2022
Belgian Golden Shoe: 2022

References

External links

1988 births
Living people
People from Sint-Truiden
Footballers from Limburg (Belgium)
Belgian footballers
Association football goalkeepers
Sint-Truidense V.V. players
Sunderland A.F.C. players
Liverpool F.C. players
Club Brugge KV players
Belgian Pro League players
Challenger Pro League players
Premier League players
UEFA Champions League winning players
Belgium youth international footballers
Belgium under-21 international footballers
Belgium international footballers
2014 FIFA World Cup players
UEFA Euro 2016 players
2018 FIFA World Cup players
UEFA Euro 2020 players
2022 FIFA World Cup players
Belgian expatriate footballers
Belgian expatriate sportspeople in England
Expatriate footballers in England
KU Leuven alumni